Bernie Little (born in McComb, Ohio, USA c. 1926 - died April 25, 2003) was the most successful owner in Unlimited Hydroplane racing history. His Miss Budweiser team won 134 of the 354 hydroplane races they entered. They won the high points championship 22 years in 40 years of competition, and the Gold Cup 14 times.  His first victory came on the Columbia River near Kennewick, Washington in 1966 for the Columbia Cup.  The winning driver, Bill Brow, won in the Miss Budweiser with a winning speed greater than 98 mph.

Little's team is also known for making an enclosed driver's cockpit to improve driver safety, after driver Dean Chenoweth was killed in a crash in Kennewick, Washington during qualification for a race in 1982.

His team employed some of the biggest names in their field, including boat designer Ron Jones, aeronautical engineer D.J. Nolan, Sr. of Bloomfield Hills, MI and drivers Chip Hanauer, Jim Kropfeld, and Dave Villwock.

Little has been inducted into the Florida Sports Hall of Fame, and was inducted into the Motorsports Hall of Fame of America in 1994. Chenoweth, Hanauer, and another driver for Little, Tom D'Eath, are also in the Motorsports Hall of Fame of America.

References

 Bernie Little - King of Boats by Fred Farley - APBA Unlimited Historian

American motorboat racers
1920s births
2003 deaths